Paracelsus is an impact crater on the Moon's far side. It is located to the east of the crater Barbier, and to the southwest of the large walled plain Vertregt. To the south is the Mare Ingenii, one of the few lunar maria on the far side.

This is a circular crater with the smaller Paracelsus Y intruding into its northwestern rim. Attached to the southwest exterior is Paracelsus P. The rim of Paracelsus is eroded, although the edge is still moderately well-defined. There is little evident terrace structure along the inner wall, and in places the features are radial to the center. The interior floor is level, with a central peak offset slightly to the west of the midpoint. There are a few tiny craterlets in the southern half of the floor.

Satellite craters
By convention these features are identified on lunar maps by placing the letter on the side of the crater midpoint that is closest to Paracelsus.

References

External links
  — 5 high resolution scans of photographs taken from the Apollo 15 manned module.

Impact craters on the Moon